Vipers Kristiansand is a handball club from Kristiansand, Norway. They currently compete in REMA 1000-ligaen, the top division in the country, since its promotion in 2001.

They claimed there first Norwegian Championship in 2018, defeating 18 times-in-a-row champions from Larvik HK. For the first time in the club's history, they qualified for the 2018–19 Women's EHF Final 4 in Budapest, where they took the 3rd place and a historic bronze medal.

Another historic event happened on 30 May 2021, when they won the 2020–21 Women's EHF Final 4 in Budapest, for the first time in the club's history. The following year they succeeded again, becoming the first Norwegian team to win Champions League two years in a row.

Honours
Norwegian League:
Gold: 2017/2018, 2018/2019, 2019/2020, 2020/2021, 2021/2022, 2022/2023
Silver: 2016/2017
Bronze: 2002/2003

Norwegian Cup:
Gold: 2017, 2018, 2019, 2020, 2021, 2022/23
Silver: 2010

EHF Champions League:
Gold: 2020/2021, 2021/2022
Bronze: 2018/2019

EHF Cup:
Finalist: 2017/2018

Team

Current squad
Squad for the 2022–23 season

Goalkeepers
1  Sofie Börjesson
 12  Julie Stokkendal Poulsen
 16  Katrine Lunde
Wingers
RW
 14  Tuva Høve 
 37  Jana Knedlíková
LW 
 10  Vilde Jonassen
 18  Mina Hesselberg
 27  Sunniva Næs Andersen
Line players
 17  Katarina Ježić
 20  Lysa Tchaptchet
 31  Ana Debelić (pregnant)

Back players
LB
 7  Martine Kårigstad Andersen
 9  Jamina Roberts
 21  Ragnhild Valle Dahl 
 51  Markéta Jeřábková 
CB
 4  Tonje Refsnes
 22  Marta Tomac (pregnant)
 25  Nerea Pena 
RB
 6  Océane Sercien-Ugolin
 8  Karine Dahlum 
 11  Silje Waade
 13  Anna Vyakhireva

Transfers
Transfers for the 2023–24 season

 Joining
  Tomáš Hlavatý (Head coach)
  Lois Abbingh (LB) (from  Odense Håndbold) 

 Leaving
  Ole Gustav Gjekstad (Head coach) (to  Odense Håndbold) 
  Endre Birkrem Fintland (Assistant coach)
  Hanna Yttereng (P) (retires)
  Markéta Jeřábková (LB) (to  Ikast Håndbold)
  Katarina Ježić (P) (to  HC Dunărea Brăila)
  Ragnhild Valle Dahl (LB) (to  Odense Håndbold)
  Nerea Pena (CB) 
  Tonje Refsnes (CB)
  Marta Tomac (CB)

Technical staff
 Head coach: Ole Gustav Gjekstad
 Assistant coach: Endre Birkrem Fintland
 Goalkeeping coach: Lene Rantala

Notable former National Team players

  Veronica Kristiansen 
  Elise Alsand
  Kristine Lunde-Borgersen
  Kari Brattset Dale
  Pernille Wibe
  Linn Jørum Sulland
  Emilie Hegh Arntzen
  Malin Aune
  Henny Reistad
  Nora Mørk
  Heidi Løke
  Andrea Austmo Pedersen
  Jessy Kramer
  Lynn Knippenborg
  Charris Rozemalen
  Annick Lipman
  Isabelle Gulldén
  Evelina Eriksson
  Louise Pedersen
  Annette Jensen
  Þórey Rósa Stefánsdóttir
  Angie Geschke
  Sakura Hauge
  Zsuzsanna Tomori

Notable former club players

  Beate Bang Grimestad
  Bodil Flo Berge
  Janne Brox
  Susanne Fuglestad
  Hilde Kvifte
  Ingunn Birkeland
  Lindy Taraldsen
  Christin Høgaas Daland
  Katrine Høyland
  Helene Jørgensen Vinknes
  Gerd Elin Albert
  Susann Iren Hall
  Pernille Wang Skaug
  Kristin Nørstebø
  Jeanett Kristiansen
  June Andenæs
  Hanna Yttereng
  Therese Helgesson
  Emma Jonsson
  Sara Nirvander
  Ulrika Olsson
  Michelle Brandstrup
  Sanne Bak Pedersen
  Mathilde Kristensen
  Birgit Van Os
  Renáta Kári-Horváth
  Karin Weigelt
  Carolina Morais

Statistics

Top scorers in the EHF Champions League 
Last updated on 11 February 2023

Individual awards in the EHF Champions League

European record

EHF Champions League

EHF European League (EHF Cup)

EHF Cup Winners' Cup (defunct)

References

External links
 Official website

Norwegian handball clubs
Handball clubs established in 1938
Sport in Kristiansand
1938 establishments in Norway